Doris Belack (February 26, 1926 – October 4, 2011) was an American character actress of stage, film and television.

Life and career
Belack was born in 1926 in New York City, the younger daughter of Isaac and Bertha Belack, Jewish immigrants from Russia. She had one sibling, an older sister. In 1955, she performed on the record Poetry of the Negro with Sidney Poitier. The record was produced by her husband, Philip Rose. 

Belack has been misidentified as the first "Mrs. Fish" to Abe Vigoda's character on Barney Miller. She was actually only a one-episode replacement for actress Florence Stanley, who played "Mrs. Fish" ("Bernice Fish"). Before that, Belack was seen mainly in soap operas; she originated the role of Anna Wolek Craig for nearly a decade on One Life to Live. She also appeared in Another World (three different roles over the show's 35-year run), The Doctors (1980, as psychiatrist Dr. Claudia Howard) and The Edge of Night (1981, as Beth Bryson who held Nancy Karr hostage). Later in the 1980s, she had the recurring role of Pine Valley's mayor on All My Children.

She played the formidable soap opera producer Rita Marshall in the 1982 comedy film Tootsie, which starred Dustin Hoffman. Her other film credits included roles in Fast Forward (1985), Batteries Not Included (1987), Splash, Too (1988), She-Devil (1989), Opportunity Knocks (1990), What About Bob? (1991), Naked Gun : The Final Insult. (1994), Krippendorf's Tribe (1998), The Odd Couple II (1998) and Fail Safe (2000).

Belack played the lead role in the short-lived television sitcom called Baker's Dozen as "Florence Baker", the no-nonsense captain of an undercover anti-crime unit of the NYPD. The show lasted a month on CBS. She guest starred on an episode of The Golden Girls in 1985 as Dorothy Zbornak's sister, Gloria.

From 1990 to 2001, she played tough, sharp-tongued Judge Margaret Barry, a recurring role on Law & Order and Law & Order: Special Victims Unit. She voiced Maureen McReary in Grand Theft Auto IV and provided the voices of Mrs. Dink and Mrs. Wingo in the Nickelodeon show Doug. Her last television appearance was on a 2003 episode of Sex and the City.

Personal life
Her husband, producer Philip Rose, died on May 31, 2011, four months before her own death. They were married for 65 years and had no children.

Partial filmography
Looking Up (1977) - Libby Levine
The Last Tenant (1978) - Housekeeper
The Black Marble (1980) - Harried Woman
We're Fighting Back (1981) - Doctor
Hanky Panky (1982) - Building Manager
Tootsie (1982) - Rita Marshall
The Cradle Will Fall (1983) - Edna Burns
Sessions (1983)
The Hearst and Davies Affair (1985) - Louella Parsons 
Fast Forward (1985) - Mrs. Gilroy
Almost Partners (1987) - Anna McCue
Batteries Not Included (1987) - Mrs. Thompson
Hostage (1988) - Edna
Splash, Too (1988) - Lois Needler
The Luckiest Man in the World (1989) - Mrs. Posner
She-Devil (1989) - Paula
Opportunity Knocks (1990) - Mona
Absolute Strangers (1991) - Fran 
What About Bob? (1991) - Dr. Catherine Tomsky
Naked Gun : The Final Insult (1994) - Dr. Roberts
What's Your Sign? (1997)
Krippendorf's Tribe (1998) - President Porter
The Odd Couple II (1998) - Blanche Madison Povitch
Doug's 1st Movie (1999) - Mayor Tippi Dink (voice)
Fail Safe (2000) - Mrs. Johnson
Law and Order SVU (2000) - Judge Margaret Barry
Prime (2005) - Blanche
True Crime: New York City (2005) - Additional voices
Delirious (2006) - Les's mother
Arranged (2007) - Elona (final film role)

References

External links
 Doris Belack obituary in Variety

1926 births
2011 deaths
American film actresses
American soap opera actresses
American stage actresses
American television actresses
American voice actresses
Actresses from New York City
Jewish American actresses
20th-century American actresses
21st-century American actresses
21st-century American Jews